David Hamilton Ledbetter is a human geneticist  best known for his contributions to the discovery of the genetic causes of Prader–Willi and Miller–Dieker syndromes. His research 

has focused on developing and applying technologies to  understand neurodevelopmental conditions such as autism spectrum disorders. He has held leadership positions at the National Institutes of Health, the University of Chicago, Emory University, and is currently the Executive Vice President and Chief Scientific Officer of Geisinger Health System.

Education

 Ledbetter received a Ph.D from the University of Texas, Austin, in 1971. He holds an American Board of Medical Genetics and Genomics certification in clinical cytogenetics.

Career

Most cited papers
Baker SJ, Fearon ER, Nigro JM, Hamilton SR, Preisinger AC, Jessup JM, VanTuinen P, Ledbetter DH, Barker DF, Nakamura Y, White R. Chromosome 17 deletions and p53 gene mutations in colorectal carcinomas. Science. 1989 Apr 14;244(4901):217-21.  (Cited 2701 times, according to Google Scholar  ) 
Miller DT, Adam MP, Aradhya S, Biesecker LG, Brothman AR, Carter NP, Church DM, Crolla JA, Eichler EE, Epstein CJ, Faucett WA. Consensus statement: chromosomal microarray is a first-tier clinical diagnostic test for individuals with developmental disabilities or congenital anomalies.   The American Journal of Human Genetics. 2010 May 14;86(5):749-64. (Cited 2498 times, according to Google Scholar.)  
Sanders SJ, Ercan-Sencicek AG, Hus V, Luo R, Murtha MT, Moreno-De-Luca D, Chu SH, Moreau MP, Gupta AR, Thomson SA, Mason CE. Multiple recurrent de novo CNVs, including duplications of the 7q11. 23 Williams syndrome region, are strongly associated with autism. Neuron. 2011 Jun 9;70(5):863-85.   (Cited 1278 times, according to Google Scholar.)  
Reiner O, Carrozzo R, Shen Y, Wehnert M, Faustinella F, Dobyns WB, Caskey CT, Ledbetter DH. Isolation of a Miller–Dicker lissencephaly gene containing G protein β-subunit-like repeats. Nature. 1993 Aug;364(6439):717-21.  (Cited 1090 times, according to Google Scholar.)  
Sanders SJ, He X, Willsey AJ, Ercan-Sencicek AG, Samocha KE, Cicek AE, Murtha MT, Bal VH, Bishop SL, Dong S, Goldberg AP. Insights into autism spectrum disorder genomic architecture and biology from 71 risk loci. Neuron. 2015 Sep 23;87(6):1215-33. (Cited2015 times, according to Google Scholar.)  
Ledbetter DH, Riccardi VM, Airhart SD, Strobel RJ, Keenan BS, Crawford JD. Deletions of chromosome 15 as a cause of the Prader–Willi syndrome. New England Journal of Medicine. 1981 Feb 5;304(6):325-9.  (Cited 734 times, according to Google Scholar.)

References

External links
 Official page at Geisinger Health System

Year of birth missing (living people)
Living people
American geneticists
Human geneticists
University of Texas at Austin alumni